The Thomas and Bridget Shanahan McMahon House, located at 603 Division St., E., in Faribault, Minnesota was built in 1870–1871, and was listed for its Faribault stone architecture on the National Register of Historic Places on July 19, 1990. It was built by Thomas McMahon, a local quarry owner.

Thomas McMahon married Bridget Shanahan in 1849, while they lived in Iowa. The McMahons had 12 children. Three died in infancy.  They moved to Faribault in 1856, where Thomas became a quarry owner. He spent $1200 on their house in 1870, and $1000 more finishing it in 1871.  The house has a great room and kitchen on floor one and two bedrooms and a bath on floor two.  The house originally did not have dormers or an external chimney.  It had two internal fireplaces at each east west side.   The small porch by the back door is also not original. It originally had a magnificent wooden, hand painted porch on the front. Sometime after 1940, that was lost. Current owners are making an effort to replicate the porch and put it back on.

References

Buildings and structures in Faribault, Minnesota
Houses completed in 1871
Houses in Rice County, Minnesota
Houses on the National Register of Historic Places in Minnesota
National Register of Historic Places in Rice County, Minnesota